Nippon is a formal way of pronouncing the native name of Japan. 

Nippon may also refer to:

"Nippon" (song), a 2014 single by Ringo Sheena
Nippon (aircraft), a converted Mitsubishi G3M2 Model 21 used to make a round-the-world flight in 1939
Nippon (Warhammer), a location in the World of Warhammer, fantasy role-playing game

See also
Names of Japan, for further comparison of Nippon, Nihon, and other names of the country